25 Gigabit Ethernet and 50 Gigabit Ethernet are standards for Ethernet connectivity in a datacenter environment, developed by IEEE 802.3 task forces  and  and are available from multiple vendors.

History 
An industry consortium, 25G Ethernet Consortium, was formed by Arista, Broadcom, Google, Mellanox Technologies and Microsoft in July 2014 to support the specification of single-lane 25-Gbit/s Ethernet and dual-lane 50-Gbit/s Ethernet technology. The 25G Ethernet Consortium specification draft was completed in September 2015 and uses technology from IEEE Std. 802.3ba and IEEE Std. 802.3bj.

In November 2014, an IEEE 802.3 task force was formed to develop a single-lane 25-Gbit/s standard, and in November 2015, a study group was formed to explore the development of a single-lane 50-Gbit/s standard.

In May 2016, an IEEE 802.3 task force was formed to develop a single-lane 50 Gigabit Ethernet standard.

On June 30, 2016, the IEEE 802.3by standard was approved by The IEEE-SA Standards Board.

On November 12, 2018, the IEEE P802.3cn Task Force started working to define PHY supporting 50-Gbit/s operation over at least 40 km of SMF.

The IEEE 802.3cd standard was approved on December 5, 2018.

On December 20, 2019, the IEEE 802.3cn standard was published. 

On April 6, 2020, 25 Gigabit Ethernet Consortium has rebranded to Ethernet Technology Consortium, and it announces 800 Gigabit Ethernet (GbE) specification.

On June 4, 2020, the IEEE approved IEEE 802.3ca which allows for symmetric or asymmetric operation with downstream speeds of 25 or 50 Gbit/s, and upstream speeds of 10, 25, or 50 Gbit/s over passive optical networks.

25 Gigabit Ethernet 
The IEEE 802.3by standard uses technology defined for 100 Gigabit Ethernet implemented as four 25-Gbit/s lanes (IEEE 802.3bj). The IEEE 802.3by standard several single-lane variations. 

 
 25GBASE-T, a 25-Gbit/s standard over twisted pair, was approved alongside 40GBASE-T within IEEE 802.3bq.

50 Gigabit Ethernet 
The IEEE   standard defines a Physical Coding Sublayer (PCS) in Clause 133 which after encoding gives a data rate of 51.5625 Gbit/s. 802.3cd also defines an RS-FEC for forward error correction in Clause 134 which after FEC encoding gives a data rate of 53.125 Gbit/s. It is not possible to transmit 53.125 Gbit/s over an electrical interface while maintaining suitable signal integrity so four-level pulse-amplitude modulation (PAM4) is used to map pairs of bits into a single symbol. This leads to an overall baud rate of 26.5625 GBd for 50 Gbit/s per lane Ethernet. PAM4 encoding for 50G Ethernet is defined in Clause 135 of the 802.3 standard.

Availability 
, 25 Gigabit Ethernet equipment is available on the market using the SFP28 and QSFP28 transceiver form factors. Direct attach SFP28-to-SFP28 copper cables in 1-, 2-, 3- and 5-meter lengths are available from several manufacturers, and optical transceiver manufacturers have announced 1310 nm "LR" optics intended for reach distances of 2 to 10 km over two strands of standard singlemode fiber, similar to existing 10GBASE-LR optics, as well as 850 nm "SR" optics intended for short reach distances of 100 m over two strands of OM4 multimode fiber, similar to existing 10GBASE-SR optics.

See also
 Ethernet Alliance

References

External links
Ethernet Technology Consortium

Ethernet